Dilla University (Amharic: ዲላ ዩኒቨርስቲ) is a public university in Dilla town, Southern Nations, Nationalities, and Peoples' Region, Ethiopia. Located in Gedeo Zone, it has over 45,000 students belonging to different faculties. Dilla University is often referred to as "University of the Greenland" because of the vibrant greenery in and around Gedeo area.

History
Dilla University has its origins in the Dilla College of Teachers’ Education and Health Sciences, first established in 1996. In 2001, it was included in the expansion of a regional Debub University ("Southern" University). From this point, the Dilla campus grew to house 12 departments, though retained a fairly small student base. In 2006, the Council of Ministers granted Dilla its own certification as an independent university, and Debub University was renamed Hawassa University.

Academics
Academics at Dilla University are organized into six colleges (Technology and Engineering; Business and Economics; Health and Medical Science; Social Science and Humanities; Agriculture and Natural Resources; and Natural and Computational Science), two institutes (Indigenous Studies; and Education and Behavioural Science), as well as separate Schools of Law, Continuing and Distance Education; and Graduate Studies.

Dilla University has 62 undergraduate, 45 masters and 4 PhD degree programs. These programs are offered in different disciplines including Agriculture, Business, Education, Engineering, Health Sciences, Natural and Social Sciences. 

The University also hosts specialized research centres focused on energy and the environment; education; Food and Nutrition; and Child, Women and Youth. 

List of programs offer in Dilla University.

Notable alumni
 Mazengia Demma, businessman and investor
 Dr.Shumete Gizaw INSA General Director

References

Universities and colleges in Southern Nations, Nationalities, and Peoples' Region
Educational institutions established in 1996
1996 establishments in Ethiopia